Edward Hines may refer to:

Edward Hines (1863–1931), American businessman and lumberman, founder of Edward Hines Lumber Company
Edward N. Hines (1870–1938), American innovator in road development